Côte d'Or is a producer of Belgian chocolate, owned by Mondelez International. Côte d'Or was founded in 1883 by Charles Neuhaus in Schaerbeek, Belgium, a chocolate manufacturer who used the name "Côte d'Or" (French for Gold Coast) referring to the old name of contemporary Ghana, the source of many of the cacao beans used in chocolate manufacturing.

Charles Neuhaus sold Côte d’Or in 1889 to the Buiswal-Leclef family, who merged with the Michiels chocolate company in 1906 to create Alimenta S.A.

Côte d'Or was later purchased by Jacobs Suchard in 1987; Jacobs Suchard in turn was purchased by Kraft General Foods in 1990, which forked off its chocolate and confectionery brands into Mondelez International in 2012, so that Mondelez is the current owner of the Côte d'Or brand.

Belgians consume 600 million Côte d'Or products a year. The Côte d'Or factory in Halle (near Brussels) used to produce 1.3 million mignonnettes (small chocolate bars—they are now produced in Poland) and two million Chokotoffs (chocolate toffees) each day.

History 

It was in 1883 that Charles Neuhaus opened a small chocolate shop in Schaerbeek in the Brussels region.

In 1889, Neuhaus retired and sold his business to Joseph Bieswal and his wife Maria Leclef. They created the Compagnie Joseph Bieswal and merged shortly after with chocolate Michiels to settle in buildings of the former mill Moulart, Bara street in Anderlecht, opposite Brussels-Midi station in 1899. Production would remain there until the 1980s.

The combination of both chocolate and machinery requirements led in 1906 to the creation of the company Alimenta S.A.

The same year, 1906, the Cote d’Or logo was born: an elephant in front of a palm tree and three pyramids, borrowed by Lambert Michiels from a Ghana stamp, which will change only slightly (the current logo is a single elephant) and the graphics brand, which has remained the same since.

The capital of the company became Alimenta S.A. and was increased to 500 000 Belgian francs and new buildings were built in 1908, home to new machines.

The famous 'package' Côte d'Or (two chocolate bars in golden white packaging), which still exists, was created in 1911.

In 1929, Supertoff, a candy toffee precursor appeared (Chokotoff came out in 1934).

During these years the company grew (350 workers at Anderlecht in 1930) and extended: the brand Cote d’Or is registered in the United States in 1931 and the Brussels World Fair in 1935 gives it an international reputation including through the Mignonette, created for the occasion.

From 1940 to 1946, faced with the difficulty of obtaining quality cocoa beans, the company decided to retire temporarily the Cote d’Or brand and replace it with the brand Congobar.

After World War II, the Cote d’Or brand was reinstated and the creations continued, including the chocolate spread Pastador in 1952.

On the occasion of the Universal Exhibition in Brussels in 1958, the praline bar "Dessert 58" is launched.

The company, which got the title "Purveyor to the Royal Court of Belgium" in 1965, accelerated its development in the 1970s: it implanted new sales offices in France, the Netherlands (1972), Switzerland and the UK in (1978), while a new factory was built in Seclin in 1974.

The company Cote d’Or of America was founded in 1982 and in 1984, 101 years after its founding, Cote d’Or was floated on the Brussels stock exchange.

The IPO marks the end of exclusively family control of the company, although Bieswal, Leclef and Michiels families retained the majority.

In 1987, Nestlé and Jacobs Suchard launched a hostile takeover bid for Cote d’Or, having the effect of a bomb on the financial center in Brussels, unaccustomed to aggressive takeovers. But the families who controlled the company were aware that they needed to grow, with new means that existing shareholders could not provide sufficiently.

They finally accepted the offer of Jacobs Suchard, which valued Cote d’Or at 116.5 million euros (4.7 billion Belgian francs, 26 times the turnover of the time).

The takeover took place in two stages: initially, in 1987, Jacobs Suchard acquired 66% of shares and finalized the complete takeover in February 1989 with the acquisition of all the shares. The action was then delisted from the Stock Exchange of Brussels.

Jacobs Suchard decided to restructure its Belgian subsidiary, which passed through the suppression of 264 jobs, but also decided to invest nearly 75 million euros (3 billion Belgian francs) and decided to make a global brand of the group.

Three years later in 1990, Jacobs Suchard was absorbed by the cigarette maker Philip Morris who integrated Cote d’Or into the Kraft General Foods group renamed Kraft Jacobs Suchard, the brand Côte d’Or remained a global quality brand of the group.

In 2000, the parent group took the name of Kraft Foods and Mondelēz international in 2012 after a split of Kraft Foods.

In 2013, Mondelēz was ranked as number one in chocolate confectionary in Belgium, accounting for 35 per cent of the Belgian chocolate retail value. With a 21 per cent value share, Côte d’Or is currently Mondelēz’s greatest asset. (Euromonitor International 2014)

Notable events 
During World War II, high-quality ingredients became unavailable. In addition, one of their factories in Marseilles, France, was destroyed during the German destruction of the Vieux Port district in early 1943. Because of this, Côte d’Or stopped producing chocolate in Marseille, making room for the lower quality Congobar.

Ethical cocoa sourcing 

There have been continuing question marks over the ethical stance of chocolate brands worldwide. After it became public in 2001 that thousands of children were being trafficked and exploited on the cocoa farms of the Ivory Coast, 
Kraft, along with the rest of the industry, signed the Harkin-Engel Protocol,
promising to remove the worst forms of child labour from the cocoa supply chain.

In October 2009 Kraft launched the first mainstream chocolate products in Europe to carry the Rainforest Alliance Certified seal. Starting in France and Belgium, this Côte d'Or premium dark chocolate contains at least 30 percent cocoa from Rainforest Alliance Certified farms. Kraft declared they would roll out the certified Côte d'Or range to consumers in the United Kingdom, Germany, Spain, Hungary, Poland, Portugal, the Netherlands, Canada and the United States. Kraft Foods also planned to use cocoa beans from Rainforest Alliance Certified farms only across its entire Côte d'Or and Marabou lines, representing some 30,000 tonnes of beans, by the end of 2012.

References

External links 

 

Belgian chocolate companies
Belgian brands
Mondelez International brands
Companies based in Flemish Brabant